Cameron Bailey (born 21 January 1996 in New Zealand) is a New Zealand rugby union player who plays for Canterbury. His playing position is wing or fullback. He was announced in the Canterbury squad for the 2021 season.

At junior level, Bailey also represented New Zealand at Australian rules football and bowls.

Reference list

External links
itsrugby.co.uk profile

Living people
1996 births
New Zealand rugby union players
Rugby union wings
Rugby union fullbacks
Rugby union centres
South Canterbury rugby union players
Canterbury rugby union players
Kamaishi Seawaves players